James Korwan (March 4, 1874 – July 24, 1899) was a 19th-century Major League Baseball pitcher. He played in one game for the Brooklyn Grooms during the 1894 season and in five games for the Chicago Colts during the 1897 season.

See also
 List of baseball players who died during their careers

External links

Baseball Almanac

1874 births
1899 deaths
19th-century baseball players
Baseball players from New York (state)
Brooklyn Grooms players
Brockton Shoemakers players
Buffalo Bisons (minor league) players
Chicago Colts players
Macon Hornets players
Major League Baseball pitchers
New Bedford Whalers (baseball) players
Sportspeople from Brooklyn
Baseball players from New York City
Springfield Maroons players
Springfield Ponies players
19th-century deaths from tuberculosis
Tuberculosis deaths in New York (state)
Burials at Green-Wood Cemetery